Blowout or Blow out may refer to:

Film and television
Blow Out, a 1981 film by Brian De Palma
 The Blow Out, a 1936 short film
 Blow Out (TV series), a TV series on Bravo
 "Blow Out" (Prison Break), an episode of Prison Break
 "Blowout", an episode of Mayday
 "Blow Out", an episode of MacGyver
 La Grande Bouffe, a 1973 Italian film, know in English as Blow-Out

Science and technology
Blowout (geomorphology), a sandy depression caused by the removal of sediment by wind
Blowout (tire), a sudden loss of tire pressure
Blowout (well drilling), a sudden release of oil and gas from a well
Blowout grass, a type of grass found on sand dunes
Blowout fracture, a type of skull fracture
Blowout panel, a protective feature of ammunition bins
Blown out, a type of wave

Music
 "Blow Out", a song by Radiohead
 "Blowout", a song by the Crystal Method
 "Blow Out", a single by Konomi Suzuki used in Akashic Records of Bastard Magic Instructor.

Other uses
 Blowout (haircut), a shorter hairstyle also known as a temple fade
 Blowout (hairstyle), a longer hairstyle also known as a Dominican blowout
 Blowout (sports), an easy or one-sided victory
 BlowOut, a 2003 video game
 Blowout, Texas, an unincorporated community
 Party horn or blow-out
 Blowout, a novel by Byron Dorgan and David Hagberg
 Blowout (book), a 2019 non-fiction book by Rachel Maddow

See also
Blown out highlights, in photography